The 2020–21 season was the 102nd season in the existence of Angers SCO and the club's sixth consecutive season in the top flight of French football. In addition to the domestic league, Angers participated in this season's edition of the Coupe de France. The season covered the period from 1 July 2020 to 30 June 2021.

Players

First-team squad
As of 1 March 2021.

Out on loan

Transfers

In

Out

Pre-season and friendlies

Competitions

Overall record

Ligue 1

League table

Results summary

Results by round

Matches
The league fixtures were announced on 9 July 2020.

Coupe de France

Statistics

Goalscorers

References

External links

Angers SCO seasons
Angers